Sakao Island, also known as Khoti Island, is an island in Vanuatu, located off the southeastern shore of Vanuatu's second-largest island, Malakula, in Malampa Province.

The island is about 3 km wide and 0.8 km long.  .

See also
List of islands of Vanuatu

References

Islands of Vanuatu
Sanma Province